Charles Furse may refer to:

 Charles Wellington Furse (1868–1904), English painter
 Charles Furse (priest) (1821–1900), Archdeacon of Westminster